Godrej Agrovet Limited is an Indian company which operates in the animal feed and agribusiness sectors. The company, which is part of the highly diversified Godrej Group, had a turnover of around Rs. 3100 Cr (Rs. 31 billion) in FY 2012–13. Godrej Agrovet's chairman is Nadir Godrej. The company's subsidiary, Astec LifeSciences, manufactures agrochemicals.

Business lines

Animal feed
The company is one of the biggest players in the animal feed business in India, producing over 10,57,000 tons/year of animal feed and nutrition products. Their products service the dairy cattle, broiler chicken, layer chicken and aquaculture sectors. The major manufacturing facilities are:
Khanna, Punjab. Inaugurated in 2013, the animal feed plant in Khanna is the biggest manufacturing plant of broiler feed and layer feed in India. With a capacity of around 1000 tons/day, this plant caters to the poultry feed market in North India. The plant was installed by Neotech and Buhler.
Kharagpur: Highly automated plant of capacity of 500 tons/day. Upcoming, as of 2013.
Baramati: Highly automated plant of capacity of 500 tons/day. Upcoming, as of 2013.
Bangalore: Highly automated plant of capacity of 500 tons/day. Upcoming, as of 2013. 
Erode: Highly automated plant of capacity of 500 tons/day. Upcoming, as of 2013.
GAVL has also entered Bangladesh through a joint venture with the ACI Group, where it is rapidly becoming a key player in both animal feed and poultry breeding sectors.

Poultry farms
Godrej Tyson food is the joint venture of Godrej Agrovet with Tyson Foods of USA. Set up in 2008, the company operates large-scale poultry farms and other meat processing facilities to cater to the Indian meat market. The poultry farms, which are highly automated and modern, manufacture and market packaged processed poultry products in India. The company offers a wide range of packaged products in the brand name of Good Chicken and Yummiez. The manufacturing plants are located in Mumbai and Bangalore.

The company has also entered the poultry sector in Bangladesh in a big way. It has forged a joint venture with the ACI Group, where it is rapidly becoming a key player in both animal feed and poultry breeding sectors.

Oil palm plantations
The company is the one of the largest oil palm developers in India. The area under oil palm plantation is more than 55,000 hectares spread across Telangana, Andhra Pradesh, Karnataka, Tamil Nadu, Goa, Maharashtra, Orissa and Mizoram. The company works directly with the farmers for oil palm production. Very recently in Mizoram, the company have commissioned a mill, which is the largest private sector industrial facility in Mizoram.

Agri-inputs
The agri-inputs business is a niche player in innovative agro-chemicals, with strong market share in plant growth promoters, soil conditioners and cotton herbicide. Godrej Agrovet is the world's largest producers and marketers of Homobrassinolides  and also the leader in selective post-emergence cotton herbicides in India and have a 45% market share in the Triacontanol segment.

Organizational structure 
Currently Balram Singh Yadav is heading the business as managing director of the company. Adi Godrej and Nadir Godrej are the chairmen of the Godrej group and Godrej Agrovet respectively. The company have more than 3000 employees and a network of over 10,000 rural distributors/dealers, who works for different business of the company.

IPO and stock market listing 

Godrej Agrovet launched its IPO on 4 October 2017 and closed on 6 October 2017. Its IPO size was 1157 Crore and got listed on 16 October 2017.

Astec LifeSciences 
Astec LifeSciences is a subsidiary of Godrej Agrovet. The company's chairman is Nadir Godrej. In 2015, Godrej Agrovet acquired 45.29% of Astec LifeSciences, and by May 2021, Godrej Agrovet owned 62.33% of the company. The company manufactures active ingredients and intermediates for the agrochemicals industry which, as of 2021, comprises approximately 80% of the revenue. Rest of the revenue comes from the contract research and manufacturing (CRAMS) segment, in which Astec LifeSciences manufactures key herbicides and fungicides for international companies.

References

External links
 Official Site

Companies based in Mumbai
Godrej Group
Animal feed companies of India
Year of establishment missing
Companies listed on the National Stock Exchange of India
Companies listed on the Bombay Stock Exchange